Mirza Ghulam Aḥmad (February 13, 1835 – May 26, 1908) was a religious figure from India, and the founder of the Ahmadiyya Muslim Community. He claimed to be the Mujaddid (divine reformer) of the 14th Islamic century, the promised Messiah ("Second Coming of Christ"), and the Mahdi awaited by the Muslims in the end days. He declared that Jesus (Isa) had in fact survived the crucifixion and later died a natural death, after having migrated towards Kashmir and that he had appeared in the likeness of Jesus.

Mirza Ghulam Ahmad is known to have produced a vast amount of literature. He wrote more than ninety books, many of which extend to hundreds of pages. His written works often contain both prose and  poetry in three different languages, Urdu, Arabic and  Persian, though primarily Urdu. His writings contain the exposition and explanation of Islamic teachings, often reinterpreted. A wide range of subjects are also dealt with such as mysticism and the intricate issues of Islamic theology. His writings always used the Qur'an to elaborate and give meanings to various ideas. Many of his books bear a polemical and apologetic tone in favour of Islam. Several of his books were distributed internationally during his lifetime. His essay entitled The Philosophy of the Teachings of Islam (originally presented at a conference of religions held in Lahore in December 1896 and later published as a book) was well received by various intellectuals including Leo Tolstoy of Russia.

His works were collected under the leadership of Mirza Nasir Ahmad, the third khalifa of Ghulam Ahmad. Most of his writings were compiled in the twenty-three volume corpus known as Rūhānī Khazā᾽in (Spiritual Treasures) which includes his books, pamphlets, and various articles.  His announcements and advertisements were collected in the Majmu'a Ishtihārāt (Collection of Announcements) with only a small number of his books being translated into English. His letters have been compiled into 4 volumes known as Maktūbāt-e-Ahmad (Letters of Ahmad) and his complete discourses or sayings have been compiled in 10 volumes known as the Malfūzāt (Spoken Words). All works were initially diligently hand composed by calligraphers (کاتب).  Nazarat Ishaat Pakistan based in Rabwah, and Nazarat Nashro Ishaat, Qadian, India have been the key organizations responsible for preserving, composing and publishing the works in hand composed and computerized versions. Mirza Ghulam Ahmed died in Lahore on 26th May, 1908.

List of books

Notes

References
 

Works by Mirza Ghulam Ahmad
Bibliographies by writer
Bibliographies of Indian writers
Religious bibliographies